Daughter-in-law is a kinship relationship as a result of marriage.

Daughter-in-law may also refer to:

Daughter-in-Law, or Bahurani, a 1940 film
Daughters-in-Law, a 2007–08 South Korean television series

See also
In-law (disambiguation)